Fernando (or Fernán) Sánchez de Tovar, 1st Lord of Belves (died 1384) was a Castilian soldier and Admiral of the Middle Ages.

Soldier of Castile
Fernando Sánchez de Tovar was the Adelantado Mayor of Pedro of Castile at the start of the First Castilian Civil War, but in 1366 he betrayed the King and delivered the city of Calahorra to Pedro's brother and enemy, Henry of Trastámara. One year later, Fernando Sánchez de Tovar fought on Henry II of Castile's side in the Battle of Nájera.

Admiral

In 1374 he succeeded the Genoese Ambrosio Boccanegra as Major Admiral of Castile.

Due to the hostile politics of John of Gaunt, 1st Duke of Lancaster, the new king, Henry II of Castile joined the French side during the Hundred Years' War and declared war on England. In the port of Brest, the Count of Salisbury burnt seven Castilian merchant ships killing all their sailors.  Sánchez de Tovar led an punishment expedition fleet along with the French Jean de Vienne to South England and sacked and burned the Isle of Wight and the English ports of Rye, Rottingdean, Winchelsea, Lewes, Folkestone, Plymouth, Portsmouth and Hastings. The joint forces defeated Sussex's levies led by the Earl of Arundel at Lewes. In 1380 the joint fleet sailed up the Thames and burned Gravesend, over 20 miles east of London.

In 1381, Sánchez de Tovar returned to the Iberian Peninsula to fight against England's ally, Portugal, and defeated a Portuguese squadron at the Battle of the Saltes Island during the Third Ferdinand War. John I of Castile, son and successor of Henry II, created him Lord of Belves. In 1382 he travelled to France and joined the army of Charles VI during the siege of Bruges, ruled by the rebel Philip van Artevelde, but he soon returned to Castile.

Ferdinand I of Portugal died in 1383 without heir and John I of Castile claimed the Portuguese throne because he was married to the only daughter of the late king, Beatrice of Portugal. However, the Master of the Order of Aviz, Ferdinand's bastard brother, John of Avis, also claimed the throne and Castile declared war against him, starting the 1383-1385 crisis. In this new campaign, Sánchez de Tovar led the Castilian fleet against the Portuguese and took part in the siege of Lisbon, where he died in 1384 from the plague.

See also
 Battle of La Rochelle
 Juan de Tovar

Notes

References
Fernández Duro, Cesáreo (1995) La Marina de Castilla. Madrid (in Spanish) 
Díaz González, Francisco Javier, Calderón Ortega, José Manuel (2001) Los almirantes del "Siglo de Oro" de la marina castellana medieval. Madrid (in Spanish)  ISSN 0214-3038

1384 deaths
Spanish admirals
Spanish generals
14th-century deaths from plague (disease)
14th-century Castilians
People of the 1383–1385 Portuguese interregnum
Year of birth unknown
Medieval admirals